James Gibson (born 23 April 1989 in Irvine, Scotland) is a Scottish footballer who plays as a left back for Maybole in the Ayrshire District League. Originally signed with Hamilton Academical, his playing career in the Scottish Football League and Scottish Premier League with was plagued by persistent knee injuries. Gibson's contract with Accies was not renewed in 2011 and he signed for Junior side Maybole in January 2012.

Career 
James Gibson's footballing career was short with Hamilton Athletic. He made 43 appearances for the club. He played left back and occasionally midfield. His best moments were of him scoring his two goals over his five-year career. Injuries however, derailed his career. He had awful knee injuries that caused him to miss numerous games. Overall his career was disappointing and was cut off short. His brightest moment was winning the domestic championship with Hamilton Academical in the 2007/2008 season.

Honours
 Scottish Football League First Division: 2007–08

References

External links

1989 births
Living people
Footballers from Irvine, North Ayrshire
Scottish footballers
Hamilton Academical F.C. players
Scottish Junior Football Association players
Association football fullbacks
Scottish Premier League players
Scottish Football League players
Maybole F.C. players